Mats Nyberg (13 December 1959 – 13 February 1999) was a Swedish sailor. He competed at the 1988 Summer Olympics, the 1992 Summer Olympics, and the 1996 Summer Olympics.

References

External links
 

1959 births
1999 deaths
Swedish male sailors (sport)
Olympic sailors of Sweden
Sailors at the 1988 Summer Olympics – Flying Dutchman
Sailors at the 1992 Summer Olympics – Flying Dutchman
Sailors at the 1996 Summer Olympics – Tornado
People from Växjö
Sportspeople from Kronoberg County
20th-century Swedish people